Dame Margery Irene Corbett Ashby,  ( Corbett; 19 April 1882 – 15 May 1981) was a British suffragist, Liberal politician, feminist and internationalist.

Background
She was born at Danehill, East Sussex, the daughter of Charles Corbett, a barrister who was briefly Liberal MP for East Grinstead and Marie (Gray) Corbett, herself a Liberal feminist and local councillor in Uckfield. Margery was educated at home. Her governess was the feminist polymath Lina Eckenstein. Eckenstein was to become her friend and assisted with her work.

She passed the Classical tripos as a student at Newnham College, Cambridge; but the university did not at that time give degrees to female students. She married lawyer Brian Ashby in 1910. Their only child, a son, Michael Ashby (1914-2004), was a neurologist who gave evidence as an expert witness at the 1957 trial of suspected serial killer John Bodkin Adams.

Political career

With her sister Cicely and friends, she founded the Younger Suffragists in 1901. After deciding against teaching, she was appointed Secretary of the National Union of Women's Suffrage Societies in 1907. She served as President of the International Woman Suffrage Alliance from 1923 to 1946.

She received an honorary LLD from Mount Holyoke College (USA) in 1937 in recognition of her international work. In 1942, she went on a government propaganda mission to Sweden.

Ashby was one of the seventeen women candidates to contest a parliamentary election at the first opportunity in the General Election of 1918. She stood for Birmingham Ladywood against Neville Chamberlain the Unionist Coalition candidate. Her slogan was A soldier's wife for Ladywood. Although she came third behind Chamberlain and the Labour candidate J.W.Kneeshaw, she forced Chamberlain to address women's issues during his campaign, one of the few candidates who tried.

Her papers at the Women's Library at the LSE in London contain a selection of her affectionate letters to her husband who was still in France for the early stages of the campaign. Chamberlain kept his sisters up to date with the campaign and his letters are preserved in the Cadbury Research Library at the University of Birmingham. Together they provide a unique record of the candidates' contrasting view of the election campaign.

In 1922 and 1923 she contested Richmond, Surrey, 1924 Watford, 1929 Hendon, and 1935 and 1937 Hemel Hempstead. Finally, she stood as an independent liberal with the backing of Radical Action at the 1944 Bury St Edmunds by-election.

Archives
The archives of Margery Corbett Ashby are held at The Women's Library at the London School of Economics.

Posthumous recognition
Her name and picture (and those of 58 other women's suffrage supporters) are on the plinth of the statue of Millicent Fawcett in Parliament Square, London, unveiled in 2018.

Electoral record

References

External links
 Biodata
 Oxford DNB
 Biodata

1882 births
1981 deaths
Alumni of Newnham College, Cambridge
British activists
British women activists
Liberal Party (UK) parliamentary candidates
International Alliance of Women people
British feminists
British women in politics
Dames Commander of the Order of the British Empire
People from Danehill, East Sussex